Christopher Charles Norris (born 6 November 1947) is a British philosopher and literary critic.

Career

Norris completed his PhD in English at University College London in 1975. After an early career in literary and music criticism (during the late 1970s, he wrote for the now-defunct magazine Records and Recording), Norris moved in 1991 to the Cardiff Philosophy Department. In 1997, he was awarded the title of Distinguished Research Professor in the Cardiff School of English, Communication & Philosophy. He has also held fellowships and visiting appointments at a number of institutions, including the University of California, Berkeley, the City University of New York, Aarhus University, and Dartmouth College.

He is one of the world's leading scholars on deconstruction, and the work of Jacques Derrida. He has written numerous books and papers on literary theory, continental philosophy, philosophy of music, philosophy of language and philosophy of science. More recently, he has been focussing on the work of Alain Badiou in relation with both the analytic tradition (particularly analytic philosophy of mathematics) and with the philosophy of Derrida.

Selected works
 Deconstruction: Theory and Practice. London; New York: Methuen, 1982
 *Inside the Myth: Orwell, Views from the Left (Ed). London: Lawrence and Wishart, 1984
 The Contest of Faculties: Philosophy and Theory After Deconstruction. 1985
 Derrida (Fontana Modern Masters). Cambridge, Mass.: Harvard University Press, 1987
 Paul de Man: Deconstruction and the Critique of the Aesthetic Ideology. Routledge, 1988/2009
 What's Wrong with Postmodernism: Critical Theory and the Ends of Philosophy. Johns Hopkins University Press, 1990
 Spinoza and the Origins of Modern Critical Theory. Oxford: Basil Blackwell, 1991
 Uncritical Theory: Postmodernism, Intellectuals, and the Gulf War. Amherst: The University of Massachusetts Press, 1992
 Truth and the Ethics of Criticism. Manchester University Press.
 Resources of Realism: Truth, Meaning, and Interpretation. Palgrave, 1997
 Against Relativism: Philosophy of Science, Deconstruction, and Critical Theory. Oxford: Blackwell Publishers, 1997
 New Idols of the Cave: On the Limits of Anti-realism. Manchester University Press, 1997
 Quantum Theory and the Flight from Realism: Philosophical Responses to Quantum Mechanics. London; New York: Routledge, 2000
 Minding the Gap: Epistemology and Philosophy of Science in the Two Traditions. Amherst: University of Massachusetts Press, 2000
 Hilary Putnam: Realism, Reason, and the Uses of Uncertainty.. Manchester University Press, 2002
 Truth Matters: Realism, Anti-realism and Response-dependence. Edinburgh University Press, 2002
 Platonism, music and the listener's share. London: Continuum, 2006
 Badiou's Being and Event: A reader's guide. London; New York: Continuum, 2009
 Re-thinking the Cogito. Naturalism, Rationalism and the Venture of Thought. London; New York: Continuum, 2010
 Derrida, Badiou, and the Formal Imperative. Continuum, 2012
 Philosophy Outside-in: A Critique of Academic Reason. Edinburgh University Press, 2013

See also
List of thinkers influenced by deconstruction

References

External links
Christopher Norris’ webpage at Cardiff University
Audio recording of Norris  on the role of philosophy in relation to neuroscience at Cardiff 'Philosophy Cafe'
CBC Podcast for the series 'How to think about science' with Christopher Norris discussing scientific realism

1947 births
Living people
Dartmouth College faculty
Deconstruction
British literary critics
Alumni of University College London
Academics of Cardiff University
English philosophers